Pierre Fleche Creek is a stream in Saline County in the U.S. state of Missouri. It is a tributary of the Missouri River.

Pierre Fleche Creek is a French name meaning roughly "Arrow Rock Creek".

See also
List of rivers of Missouri

References

Rivers of Saline County, Missouri
Rivers of Missouri